Imagination is the final studio album led by trumpeter Woody Shaw which was recorded in 1987 and released on the Muse label. Imagination was reissued by Mosaic Records as part of Woody Shaw: The Complete Muse Sessions in 2013.

Reception

Scott Yanow of Allmusic stated, "Trumpeter Woody Shaw's final album as a leader (cut less than two years before his passing) is surprisingly upbeat. Although his health became shaky, Shaw never declined as a player, as he shows throughout the spirited quintet outing... Recommended".

Track listing 
 "If I Were a Bell" (Frank Loesser) - 5:27
 "Imagination" (Jimmy Van Heusen, Johnny Burke) - 7:28  
 "Dat Dere" (Bobby Timmons, Oscar Brown, Jr.) - 8:13
 "You and the Night and the Music" (Howard Dietz, Arthur Schwartz) - 6:06
 "Stormy Weather" (Harold Arlen, Ted Koehler) - 8:00
 "Steve's Blues" (Steve Turre) - 4:48

Personnel 
Woody Shaw - trumpet
Steve Turre - trombone
Kirk Lightsey - piano
Ray Drummond - bass
Carl Allen - drums

References 

Woody Shaw albums
1988 albums
Muse Records albums
Albums recorded at Van Gelder Studio